Johann Baptist Zimmermann (3 January 1680, Gaispoint — 2 March 1758, Munich) was a German painter and a prime stucco plasterer during the Baroque.

Zimmermann was born in Gaispoint, Wessobrunn.  He and his brother Dominikus Zimmermann were descended from an artist family of the Wessobrunner School.

Work 

 1701 stucco and fresco for the church Mariä Empfängnis of Gosseltshausen
 1707 stucco and fresco for the church Maria Schnee in Markt Rettenbach
 vor 1710 und 1728: Stucco for the Tegernsee Abbey
 1709/1710: Design for the church St. Johannes in Neuburg an der Kammel-Edelstetten
 1709/1710-1713/1727 (cooperation with his brother): Fresco of  Marienkapelle and stucco and fresco for the library of  Reichskartause in Buxheim (Allgäu)
 1711-1713: stucco and fresco for the Klosterkirche Maria Saal
 1714: stucco and fresco of Pfarrkirche St. Sixtus von Schliersee
 1714-1722: Stucco for the Ottobeuren Abbey
 ca 1715 stucco and fresco for rooms of Maxlrain castle
 (since) 1716 stucco and fresco for the Benediktuskirche in Freising
 1717: stucco and fresco in the chapel and the dining room of  Ismaning palace
 1718-1722 (cooperation with his brother): decoration of the church Mariä Himmelfahrt in Maria Medingen
 1720-1726: Stucco for the Grand Stairway of Schleissheim Palace under Joseph Effner
 1720-1726/1727: Stucco for the Sommerzimmer and the Spiegelsaal of the first northern Pavillon of Nymphenburg Palace
 1722/1723 (cooperation with his brother): Decoration of St. Mary in Bad Wörishofen
 1724 und 1731-1733: stucco and fresco for Benediktbeuern Abbey
 1725/1726-1727/1729: Design and stucco of St. Peter und Paul in Buxheim (Allgäu)
 1725/1727-1728/1733 (cooperation with his brother): Decoration of St. Markus in Sießen/Saulgau
 1726-1733: stucco for the Residenz, Munich
 1727-1733: Decoration of St. Peter und Paul in Steinhausen
 1727/1730-1731/1733 (cooperation with his brother): Fresco of the church in Steinhausen
 1729: stucco and fresco of St. Peter und Paul in Weyarn
 1729/1741-1741/1748: stucco and fresco of Mariä Himmelfahrt church in Dietramszell
 1730 stucco and fresco of the church of Beyharting
 1730-1739: Stucco in the Reiche Zimmern of the Residenz, Munich
 1732: Fresco of Neumünster church in Würzburg
 1733/34: Decoration of the monastery Seligenthal in Landshut
 1733/1754-1756/1760: stucco and fresco of St. Dionys und Juliana in Schäftlarn Abbey
 1734-1737/1739: stucco of the Amalienburg in Munich-Nymphenburg
 1735/1738-1740: Design of the Mariä Himmelfahrt in Prien am Chiemsee
 1737/1743-1744/1752: stucco and fresco of St. Michael in Berg am Laim
 1738: House Kern in Wasserburg am Inn
 1745-1752: Design and stucco of Ettal Abbey
 1747/1749-1752: baroque renovation of St. Blasius in Landshut
 1748/1752-1752/1754: stucco and fresco of the church  "Maria Brünnlein zum Trost" in Wemding
 1749 und 1753-1754: fresco in the Wieskirche

 1751-1752/1754: stucco and fresco in Andechs Abbey St. Nikolaus und St. Elisabeth
 1751-1761: baroque renovation of the church St. Anna in München-Harlaching
 1753/1754: stucco and fresco in St. Peter in Munich
 1755/56-1757: stucco and fresco of the Steinerner Saal in Nymphenburg Palace in Munich
 1756: Fresco of Prämonstratenserklosterkirche in Neustift
 1757: Decoration of Pfarrkirche St. Vitus in Abensberg-Offenstetten

External links 
 
 
 Entry for Johann Baptist Zimmermann on the Union List of Artist Names

1680 births
1758 deaths
People from Weilheim-Schongau
German Baroque painters
German Baroque sculptors
18th-century German painters
18th-century German male artists
German male painters
18th-century German sculptors
German male sculptors